Fred Daniels born George Frederick William Daniels (Churchover, Warwickshire), 1892 – 1959. Daniels was a pioneer of still photography in the film industry  and recognised by the BFI.

Biography

His innovative techniques and experiments with light created a more sophisticated still image. Daniels was born in Churchover, Warwickshire on 26 July 1892. Fred was educated at Bablake School in Coventry. In 1925 he started his career as a freelance photographer in the South of France and photographed dancer and choreographer Margaret Morris. The Antibes summer schools attracted artists from the performing arts, and for Daniels it was an opportunity to capture the grace and elegance of the human form. His camera studies were also published in The Sketch and Tatler magazines.

Daniels entered the film industry in 1929 when he took stills of Anna May Wong at Elstree Studios to promote Piccadilly. The film was a success, and in the same year Daniels was hired for the Titanic disaster film Atlantic starring John Longden and Madeline Carroll. In 1932 he photographed Brigitte Helm during the filming of The Blue Danube directed by Herbert Wilcox. Daniels was admired by producer H.B. Warner for his stills and was offered a contract in Hollywood. During the 1930s his career developed with the British and Dominions Film Company, and he became their star photographer, taking portraits of actors such as Anna Neagle.

In 1939 Daniels set up his own portrait studio in Coventry Street as a specialist portrait photographer. The film industry tended to be integrated and outside specialists were discouraged. The studios achieved control by relying on staff stills photographers under contract to the studio and encouraged membership of the film union ACTT to avoid freelance photographers to manoeuvre into the industry. However, with the support of the Independent Producers Michael Powell and Emeric Pressburger Daniels managed to progress on his own terms. From his small third floor studio next to the London Trocadero he took portraits of Leslie Howard and Laurence Olivier to promote the film 49th Parallel. Soon after the studio in Coventry Street was damaged during a London bombing raid. In 1942 the studio re opened and Daniels took studio portraits of Pamela Brown and Googie Withers for One of Our Aircraft is Missing. In 1943  Powell and Pressburger commissioned Daniels to photograph Ralph Richardson for their film about The Fleet Air Arm titled The Volunteer (1944 film). This was followed by a full stills assignment at Pinewood Studios and over two hundred production stills were taken during Life and Death of Colonel Blimp.The actors Roger Livesey and Deborah Kerr were additionally photographed at his portrait studio. In 1944 Sheila Sim and Eric Portman were photographed during A Canterbury Tale, and Wendy Hiller during I Know Where I'm Going! In 1945 Kim Hunter, and David Niven were sitters during the filming of A Matter of Life and Death In 1946 Sabu and Deborah Kerr were photographed during the filming of Black Narcissus at Pinewood Studios. In 1949 he worked on Gone to Earth and  sitters included Jennifer Jones and David Farrar respectfully. During the same year Daniels photographed David Niven for The Elusive Pimpernel (1950 film) although it was not a major work. In 1955 Powell and Pressburger hired Daniels to promote Battle of the River Plate. His association with Powell and Pressburger was the most creative period of his career and he became a trusted member of their team. Daniels was also recruited by Michael Powell Theatre Productions between 1944 and 1949 including publicity photographs for The Fifth Column by Ernest Hemingway and performed in London by Roger Livesey and Margaret Johnston. From 1956 onwards Daniels continued working at his Coventry Street studio and at a studio created at the White House near Elstree. During this period work was generated by society magazines and personal commissions from James Mason and Glynis Johns. In 1959 his health deteriorated and he died suddenly of a heart attack. A permanent collection of his work is held by the National Portrait Gallery in London, The Fergusson Gallery in Perth and by the BFI National Archive.

References

Sources
 Fred Daniels. Powell and Pressburger Portraits. Published by Twarda Sztuka Foundation 2012. 
 Archive material held at the Heinz Library, National Portrait Gallery.

Fred Daniels [ early biographical details and authenticated photographs]

Photographers from Warwickshire
1892 births
1959 deaths

 BFI National Archive/ Collections www.bfi.org.uk